Francesco Battaglioli (Modena, 1725 – Venice, 1796) was an Italian painter, known as painter of veduta and capriccios based on  the scenery of Venice and the Venetian mainland (Brescia and Treviso).

Biography
Battaglioli was born in Modena. He is said to have been a pupil of Raffaello Rinaldi. He joined the Fraglia or guild of painters in Venice between 1747-51. He became a member of the Accademia di Belle Arti in Venice in 1772, and he succeeded Antonio Visentini as professor of perspective in 1778.

Some of his veduta are of Aranjuez in Spain, where he went to paint scenery sets for the Reales Coliseos theater held in the Palacio Real de Aranjuez for the delight of Ferdinand VI. It is believed they were a set of at least four, of which two are exhibited at the Prado Museum in Madrid. Here he also worked with Farinelli in painting stage sets for Pietro Metastasio's operas. From that series four of them are preserved at the Real Academia de Bellas Artes de San Fernando (La Nitteti, Didone Abbandonata, Armida Placata Second Act, scene VII, and Knight fighting dragons in a forest), another at the Prado (Armida Placata First Act, scene IV). Battaglioli's veduta were engraved by Francisco Zucchi and used to illustrate Baldassare Camillo Zamboni's Memorie intorno alle pubbliche fabbriche (1778).

References 

 Torrione, Margarita, Francesco Battaglioli. Escenografías para el Real Teatro del Buen Retiro (exhibition catalogue), Madrid, Real Academia de Bellas Artes de San Fernando, Teatro de la Zarzuela, INAEM, 2013.
 Torrione, Margarita, Nueve óleos de Francesco Battaglioli para el Coliseo del Buen Retiro. (La ópera en el reinado de Fernando VI: último relumbrón de la Corte Barroca.), in J. Martínez Millán, C. Camarero Bullón, M. Luzzi Traficante (coords.), La corte de los Borbones: crisis del modelo cortesano, Madrid, Ed. Polifemo, 2013, vol. 3, pp. 1733–1777.
 TORRIONE, Margarita, "La sociedad de Corte y el ritual de la ópera", in Fernando VI y Bárbara de Braganza. Un reinado bajo el signo de la paz : 1746-1759, exhibition catalogue, Real Academia de Bellas Artes de San Fernando (RABASF), Madrid, 2002, pp. 165–195. .
 TORRIONE, Margarita, "Decorados teatrales para el Coliseo del Buen Retiro. Cuatro óleos de Francesco Battaglioli", Reales Sitios (Revista del Patrimonio Nacional), n° 143, 2000, pp. 40–51.
 TORRIONE, Margarita, «El Real Coliseo del Buen Retiro: memoria de una arquitectura desaparecida», in TORRIONE, Margarita (dir.), España festejante. El Siglo XVIII, Málaga, CEDMA, 2000, pp. 295–322. .
 TORRIONE, Margarita,  Crónica festiva de dos reinados en la Gaceta de Madrid : 1700-1759, Paris, Ophrys, 1998. .
 J.G. Links. Canaletto and his Patrons, Paul Elek Ltd, London (1977). pp. 99–100.
 Grove encyclopedia entry on Artnet
 Domenico Sedini, Francesco Battaglioli, online catalogue Artgate by Fondazione Cariplo, 2010, CC BY-SA.

Other projects

18th-century Italian painters
Italian male painters
Italian vedutisti
1725 births
1796 deaths
Painters from Modena
Painters from Venice
18th-century Italian male artists